The CBS Sunday Movie (also known at various times as the CBS Sunday Night Movie) is the umbrella title for a made-for-TV and feature film showcase series carried by CBS until the end of the 2005–2006 television season, when it was replaced with drama series. It was the last of the weekly Sunday night movie showcases aired by the Big Three television networks to be canceled, outside of special event premieres and the network's previous run of the Hallmark Hall of Fame film anthology.

On April 7, 2020, as part of schedule changes associated with the impact of the COVID-19 pandemic on television in the United States, CBS announced that it would air feature films under the CBS Sunday Night Movies banner for a five-week event in May 2020, featuring films from corporate sister Paramount Pictures. A sixth week was added to the event to fill the timeslot of the postponed 74th Tony Awards, featuring a sing-along version of Grease.

In September 2020, CBS announced that the block would return for six additional weeks beginning in October, filling the network's Sunday-night schedule to allow time for its Sunday-night dramas (The Equalizer, NCIS: Los Angeles, and NCIS: New Orleans) to resume production.

Titles 
This is a listing of topics pertaining to CBS movies broadcast on television under various umbrella titles.

Film Theatre of the Air (1941-42, & 1949, Saturday; 1951 and 1953, Tuesday)
Premiere Playhouse (March–July 1949, Friday; 1949–50, Saturday)
Budweiser Summer Theatre (1951, Saturday)
Schlitz Film Firsts (1951, Friday)
Summer Cinema (1952, Saturday)
The CBS Thursday Night Movies (1965–75)
The CBS Friday Night Movies (1966–77)
The New CBS Tuesday Night Movies (1972–74)
The CBS Wednesday Night Movies (1977–81)
The CBS Tuesday Night Movies (1978–86)
The CBS Saturday Night Movies (1981–86)
CBS Sunday Movie (1986–2006)
CBS Tuesday Movie (1986–2000)
CBS Wednesday Movie (1986–2000)
The CBS Late Movie (1972–89)
A CBS Special Movie Presentation (1974–2006)
CBS Sunday Night Movies (2020–present)

Schedules 
This list may be incomplete

1981

1988

1989

1990

1992

1993

1994

1995

1996

1997

1998

1999

2000

2001

2002

2003

2004

2005

2006

2007

2015

2020

2021

2022

2023

References

External links
CBS Sunday Movie - TV Tango

American motion picture television series
CBS original programming
1979 American television series debuts
2006 American television series endings
2020 American television series debuts
1980s American television series
1990s American television series
Impact of the COVID-19 pandemic on television
American television series revived after cancellation